L'Espoir (English: Hope) is an album by Léo Ferré released in 1974 by Barclay Records.

Track listing
All songs written, composed, arranged and directed by Léo Ferré, except Marie, whose text is written by Guillaume Apollinaire.

Original LP

Since 2003, CD reissues add song Marie as a bonus track to the original album. This song was originally B-side of 12-inch single Je t'aimais bien, tu sais, released in 1973.

Personnel 
 Janine de Waleyne: vocals (tracks 1, 2, 4, 5, 8)
 Ivry Gitlis: violin (track 6)
 The orchestra consists of session musicians hired for the recording.

Production 
 Arranger and conductor: Léo Ferré
 Executive producer: Richard Marsan

Léo Ferré albums
French-language albums
Barclay (record label) albums
1974 albums